Events of 2019 in Bangladesh.
The year 2019 is the 48th year after the independence of Bangladesh. It is also the first year of the fourth term of the Government of Sheikh Hasina.

Incumbents 

 President: Abdul Hamid
 Prime Minister: Sheikh Hasina
 Chief Justice: Syed Mahmud Hossain
 Speaker of Jatiya Sangsad: Shirin Sharmin Chaudhury

Demography

Economy

Note: For the year 2019 average official exchange rate for BDT was 84.45 per US$.

Events 

 3 January - Prime Minister Sheikh Hasina and the ruling party Bangladesh Awami League takes oath for the 3rd consecutive term after victory at the 11th general election.
 20 February - Fire broke out in Chowk Bazar which killed near 80 peoples with more 50+ injured.
 25 February - An aircraft hijacker attempting to hijack a plane in Chittagong Airport is gunned to death in a rescue operation thus saving the plane carrying 142 passengers from being hijacked.
 28 February -
 Atiqul Islam elected as the mayor of Dhaka North City Corporation.
 Fire broke out in Bhashantek slum.
 11 March - DUCSU election held after 28 years.
 19 March - 7 people including 4 law enforcement officials were shot dead in Rangamati district during violence in local elections. The army was deployed in the area to bring the situation under control.
 28 March - FR Tower fire kills at least 19 people and more 70+ injured.
 30 March - The fourth fire of the year broke out on DNCC Market.
 3 April - Two Bangladeshis Hussain Elius and Abdullah Al Morshed featured in the honorary internationally acclaimed magazine Forbes.
 18 April - The year's fifth notable fire breaks out at a market in Malibagh area. Due to better preparations the fire was brought under control quicker than the previous fires. No deaths were reported.
 1 July to 31 August - Dengue outbreak in Bangladesh. Over 20,000 people infected by the mosquito-borne disease in all 64 districts since July. Improper cleansing of dirty water bodies have been blamed for high numbers of mosquito breeding. By August the number of infections crossed 50,000.
 24 September - Various illegal casinos were raided across the country by the police force, in an effort to stop gambling which is banned in Bangladesh. Numerous gambling organizers were detained and taken to custody by the police.
 7 October: A second year student of electrical and electronic engineering department of the Bangladesh University of Engineering and Technology (BUET), was tortured and then killed by BUET's Chhatra League leaders inside BUET's Sher-e-Bangla Hall.
 20–22 October: Riots in Bhola after police opened fire on protesters protesting against a Facebook post criticizing Islam. 4 protesters killed.
 10 November - Cyclone Bulbul killed 17 people & 14 districts were heavily affected.
 13 November - A train accident kills 20 people.
 17 November - 7 people killed in a gas explosion in Chittagong.
 12–13 December - The Keraniganj factory fire kills in total 12 people.

Awards and Recognitions

Independence Day Award
Thirteen people and an organization were awarded.

Ekushey Padak
 Halima Khatun (posthumous - Language Movement)
 Ghulam Arieff Tipoo (language Movement)
 Monowara Islam (Language Movement)
 Azam Khan (posthumous - music)
 Subir Nandi (music)
 Khairul Anam Shakil (music)
 Liaquat Ali Lucky (art)
 Suborna Mustafa (art)
 Lucky Enam (art)
 Sayeeda Khanam (photography)
 Jamal Uddin Ahmed (fine art)
 Khitindra Chandra Baishya (War of Liberation)
 Biswajit Ghosh (research)
 Mahbubul Haque (research)
 Pranab Kumar Barua (education)
 Harishankar Jaladas (language and literature)
 Moinul Ahsan Saber (language and literature)
 Anwara Syed Haq (language and literature)
 Ashim Saha (language and literature)
 Imdadul Haq Milan (language and literature)
 Rizia Rahman (language and literature)

Sports
 18 May - Bangladesh wins the tri-nations ODI Cricket series against West Indies and Ireland.
 5 July - Bangladesh leaves the 2019 Cricket World Cup after losing to Pakistan in their game at the tournament.
 1–10 December - Bangladesh archers Ety Khatun and Roman Sana won gold medals winning all the 10 archery events (both individual, and team events) in the 2019 South Asian Games.

Deaths 

 3 January - Sayed Ashraful Islam, politician
 22 January - Ahmed Imtiaz Bulbul, lyricist, composer and music director
 15 February - Al Mahmud, poet, novelist, and short-story writer
 28 February - Shah Alamgir, journalist, DG of PIB
 1 March - Polan Sarkar, social activist
 23 March - Shahnaz Rahmatullah, singer (born 1952)
 6 April - Tele Samad, Bangladeshi film actor
 14 July – Hussain Muhammad Ershad, Bangladeshi politician, 11th President of Bangladesh (b. 1930)
 16 August - Rizia Rahman, novelist (b. 1939)
 4 November - Sadeque Hossain Khoka, former mayor of Dhaka (b. 1952)
 20 December - Sir Fazle Hasan Abed, founder of BRAC

See also
 2010s in Bangladesh
 List of Bangladeshi films of 2019
 Timeline of Bangladeshi history

References

Links
 

 
Bangladesh